Alagoas is a state of Brazil. Alagoas may also refer to:
Alagoas Province, a former province of Brazil
Brazilian monitor Alagoas, a ship